Fathabad (also Romanized as Fatḩābād) is a village in Galehzan Rural District, in the Central District of Khomeyn County, Markazi Province, Iran. At the 2006 census, its population was 47, in 14 families.

References 

Populated places in Khomeyn County